Milorad Pejić (1960 in Tuzla, Bosnia and Herzegovina, former Yugoslavia) is a Bosnian poet who resides in Sweden.

Biography
After attending elementary and high school in his hometown of Tuzla, Pejić attended the University of Sarajevo, where he studied economics. Following graduation he returned to Tuzla, and in 1992, following the outbreak of the Bosnian War, he immigrated to Sweden, where he now lives.

Books
 The Vase for the Lily Plant / Vaza za biljku krin (1985)

 The Eyes of Keyholes / Oči ključaonica / Schlossaugen  (2001) (2012)  (2015)  

 Hyperborea (2011) (2013) (2016) (2018)

 The Third Life / Treći život (2015) (2019)

 True Stories / Sanna historier, poetry collection in Swedish (2019)

 True Stories: selected poems (in Czeche) / Pravdivé příběhy: vybrané básně (2020)

Awards
 November 2012: Slovo Makovo - Mak Dizdar

References

External links
 Article in Swedish about Pejić and the "Slovo Makovo - Mak Dizdar" award
 Mak Dizdar Foundation article on literary prize ”Slovo Makovo - Mak Dizdar,” awarded to Pejić in November 2012
 Article in Bosnian about Pejić and the "Hyperborea: Knjiga mjeseca" award
 Spirit of Bosnia
 Refugees and Runes of War (Bibliotekos)
 Modern Poetry in Translation
 Poems published on www.jergović.com
 CV2 The Canadian Journal of Poetry and Critical Writing
 RHINO
 Eckermann: Patriotizam je bolest
 Eckermann: Šaraf

Bosnia and Herzegovina poets
Bosnia and Herzegovina writers
1960 births
Living people